Peter Szatmari (born 1950) is a Canadian researcher of autism and Asperger syndrome.

Szatmari is a Professor and Vice-Chair, Research, Department of Psychiatry and Behavioural Neurosciences, at McMaster University. He is also the Director of the research training program in the department, and a member of the Offord Centre for Child Studies. Dr. Szatmari is Editor of the journal, Evidence-Based Mental Health, and serves on the editorial boards of several other journals.

Szatmari is known for his writings on Aspergers genetics, infant studies, and PET and MRI studies. He is also known for his diagnostic criteria for Asperger syndrome.

Szatmari helped to set up the Pervasive Developmental Disorder (PDD) team at Chedoke Child and Family Centre, a regional diagnostic and treatment program for children with a PDD diagnosis, in Hamilton, Ontario.

Szatmari is currently part of the Autism Genome Project.

Diagnostic criteria for Asperger Syndrome
Dr. Szatmari's diagnostic criteria were published in 1989 and cover five main areas: Solitary (i.e. lack of friends), impaired social interaction (i.e. difficulty relating to others), impaired nonverbal communication (i.e. not understanding body language), odd speech patterns (i.e. different use of words), and that Asperger Syndrome does not meet the criteria for autistic disorder as defined in the DSM-III-R.

Szatmari suggests that AS was promoted as a diagnosis to spark more research into the syndrome: "It was introduced into the official classification systems in 1994 and has grown in popularity as a diagnosis, even though its validity has not been clearly established. It was introduced not so much as an indication of its status as a 'true' disorder, but more to stimulate research ... its validity is very much in question."

Notes

1950 births
Autism researchers
Living people
Academic staff of McMaster University